See also Walter von Molo.

Molo is an ethnic group in Blue Nile state in Sudan.

They number less than thousand and speak Molo, a Nilo-Saharan language. Most of them or all of them are Muslims.

References
Joshua Project

Ethnic groups in Sudan

de:Molo